The 2009 MTN 8 was the 35th time that this annual tournament took place. It was contested by the eight top teams of the Premier Soccer League table at the end of the 2008-09 season. The tournament began on 4 August 2009, and ended on 24 October 2009. Golden Arrows beat Ajax Cape Town 6 – 0, in the final at Orlando Stadium.

Teams
The eight teams that competed in the MTN 8 Wafa Wafa knockout competition are: (listed according to their finishing position in the 2008–09 Premier Soccer League.

 1. Supersport United
 2. Orlando Pirates
 3. Kaizer Chiefs
 4. Free State Stars
 5. Golden Arrows
 6. Bidvest Wits
 7. Ajax Cape Town
 8. Amazulu

The draw for the first round took place of 13 July 2009. Games will be played over 4 and 5 August 2009.

Quarter-finals

Teams through to the Semi-finals

 Kaizer Chiefs
 Amazulu
 Ajax Cape Town
 Golden Arrows

Semi-finals

|}

1st Leg

2nd Leg

Final

Top scorers

3 goals
 Njabulo Manqana (Golden Arrows)
 Richard Henyekane (Golden Arrows)

2 goals
 Brett Evans (Ajax Cape Town)
 Litha Ngxabi
 Dipsy Selolwane (Ajax Cape Town)

1 goal
 Thokozani Mshengu (Golden Arrows)
 Nhlanhla Zothwane (Golden Arrows)
 Dennis Ivanovs (Golden Arrows)
 Franklin Cale (Ajax Cape Town)
 Siphiwe Tshabalala (Kaizer Chiefs)
 Josta Dladla (Kaizer Chiefs)
 Jose Torrealba (Kaizer Chiefs)
 Joseph Musonda (Golden Arrows)
 Musa Bilankulu (Golden Arrows)
 Thulani Serero (Ajax Cape Town)
 Katlego Mashego (Orlando Pirates)
 Nathi Nhleko(Kaizer Chiefs)
 David Mathebula (Kaizer Chiefs)''
 Knowledge Musona (Kaizer Chiefs)
 Mark Haskins (Bidvest Wits)
 Ayanda Dlamini (AmaZulu F.C.)
 Thabo Mongalo (Supersport United)
 Anthony Laffor (Supersport United)

External links
Premier Soccer League
South African Football Association

MTN 8
MTN
2009 domestic association football cups